Acacia difficilis is a tree belonging to the genus Acacia and the subgenus Juliflorae that is endemic to tropical parts of northern Australia.

Description
It has grey to brown branchlets that are almost terete which can be densely pubescent or glabrous. Like most species of Acacia it has phyllodes rather than true leaves. The thinly coriaceous phyllodes are silvery-white and covered in a dense mat of woolly hair when young and have five to nine prominent longitudinal nerves. It blooms from May to September producing yellow flowers.

Distribution
It is native to an area in the Kimberley region of Western Australia,  to the top end of the Northern Territory, and north-west Queensland. It is quite common in the northern parts of the Northern Territory and is also found on Thursday Island and Melville Island, it is much rarer in Western Australia where it is found around Kununurra and is also found near the Gulf of Carpentaria in Queensland. It is usually situated along creeks growing in sandy or gravelly soils as a part of open woodland communities where it is often associated with Eucalyptus tetrodonta.

See also
List of Acacia species

References

difficilis
Acacias of Western Australia
Flora of the Northern Territory
Flora of Queensland
Taxa named by Joseph Maiden
Plants described in 1917